Ibn Muhammad al-Shaizari Al-Nabarawi, Al-Nabarawi (d. 1126) Muslim Pharmacist and Alchemist from Baghdad was a devoted admirer of Al-Razi, he invented a new process of producing naphtha (Naft), from Petroleum.

References

1126 deaths
Alchemists of the medieval Islamic world